Pandi Ahmad Lestaluhu (born 7 August 1997) is an Indonesian professional footballer who plays as a winger for Liga 2 club Semen Padang.

International career
In 2016, Pandi represented the Indonesia U-19, in the 2016 AFF U-19 Youth Championship. And on 12 September 2016, in a match AFF U-19 Youth Championship against Myanmar U-19, Pandi made his first international goal.

Personal life 
Lestaluhu is one of many siblings, his older brothers Ramdani Lestaluhu, Abduh Lestaluhu, and Rafid Lestaluhu who are also professional footballers, with the first two being former teammates of his at Persija Jakarta.

References

External links
 Pandi Lestaluhu at Soccerway
 Pandi Lestaluhu at Liga Indonesia

Living people
1992 births
Indonesian footballers
Indonesia youth international footballers
Liga 1 (Indonesia) players
Persija Jakarta players
PS TIRA players
People from Tulehu
Sportspeople from Maluku (province)
Association football forwards
21st-century Indonesian people